Frankenstein is a 2004 American television miniseries based on the 1818 novel Frankenstein; or, The Modern Prometheus by Mary Shelley. It follows the original book more closely than other adaptations.

The mini-series was nominated for ASC award for Outstanding Achievement in Cinematography in Movies of the Week/Mini-Series/Pilot (Basic or Pay).  It was also nominated for an Artios award for Best Mini Series Casting.

It won the 2005 Prime Time Emmy Award for Outstanding Makeup for a Miniseries, Movie or a Special (Non-Prosthetic).

The miniseries was edited into a film.  Its UK DVD is 170 minutes long, the Spanish Blu-ray is 180 minutes long, while the American DVD is 204 minutes long.

Plot summary

Captain Robert Walton is a failed writer who sets out to explore the North Pole and expand his scientific knowledge in hopes of achieving fame. While icebound, the crew spots two dog sleds, one chasing the other. A few hours later, the crew rescues one of the sled drivers, a nearly frozen and emaciated man named Victor Frankenstein. Frankenstein starts to recover from his exertion and recounts a story of his life's miseries to Walton.

Victor begins by telling of his childhood in 1793.  Born into a wealthy family in Geneva, he grows up in a safe environment, surrounded by loving family and friends. Weeks before he leaves for university in Germany, his mother dies of scarlet fever. At university, he develops a secret technique to imbue inanimate bodies with life with electricity.

After bringing a deceased dog back to life he decides to create a life using parts of the dead. He succeeds but is repulsed by his work: he flees the room, and the Creature disappears. Collapsing from pneumonia brought on by overwork and emotional stress, he is nursed back to health by his friend, Henry Clerval and Elizabeth. He returns home to find his brother William murdered. Certain this is the work of the Creature, Victor retreats into the mountains to find peace. The Creature finds Victor and tells him how he had become afraid of people and spent the first year of his life alone, learning to speak and read through his observation of a family whose shed he lived in. After approaching the blind grandfather, who responded to him in kindness, the Creature was physically attacked by the old man's son and ran away. Traveling to Geneva, he met a little boy — Victor's brother William — outside the town of Plainpalais. Wanting to keep the boy from yelling, the creature accidentally killed him. Even though this was accidental the creature took this as his first act of vengeance against his creator. The Creature concludes his story with a demand that Frankenstein create for him a female companion like himself promising that if Victor grants his request, he and his mate will vanish into the uninhabited  wilderness of South America.

Victor reluctantly agrees. Clerval tries to talk Victor out of his mission. Horrified by the idea that creating a mate for the Creature might lead to the breeding of an entire race of creatures, he abandons the project, destroying the notebook in which he had recorded the method by which he had brought the male Creature to life and then setting fire to the not-yet-living Bride. Furious, the Creature swears vengeance against Victor, promising to "be with him on his wedding night," and, shortly after, murders Clerval. Victor is imprisoned for the murder and suffers a mental breakdown. After being acquitted, and with his health renewed, he returns home with his father. Once home, Victor marries Elizabeth, but on the evening of the wedding, the Creature sneaks into the bedroom and strangles her to death. Victor's father goes mad with grief. Victor vows to hunt down and destroy the Creature. After months of pursuit, the two end up in the Arctic Circle, near the North Pole.

After hearing Frankenstein's story, Walton relents and agrees to head for home. Frankenstein begs the captain to finish off what he could not, as the creature cannot be left alive. Close to death, he sees the ghost of his beloved wife beckoning to him, and dies shortly after. Walton soon after discovers the Creature on his ship, mourning over Frankenstein's body. Walton hears the Creature's misguided reasons for his vengeance as well as expressions of remorse. Frankenstein's death has not brought him any peace. Rather, his crimes have increased his misery and alienation; he has found only his own emotional ruin in the destruction of his creator and feels once again abandoned. He vows to kill himself on his own funeral pyre so that no others will ever know of his existence. Walton watches as the Creature, carrying his creator's body, wanders off into the icy wastes of the arctic never to be seen again.

Cast 
Alec Newman as Victor Frankenstein
Luke Goss as The Creature
Julie Delpy as Caroline Frankenstein
Nicole Lewis as Elizabeth Frankenstein
Monika Hilmerová as Justine Moritz
Donald Sutherland as Captain Walton
William Hurt as Professor Waldman
Dan Stevens as Henry Clerval
Mark Jax as Alphonse Frankenstein
Tomas Mastalir as Lieutenant
Milan Bahúl as Farmer
Lianna Bamberg as Young Elizabeth
Gabika Birova as Timid Servant
Edita Borsova as Agatha
Sonny Brown as Young Victor
Gordon Catlin as Father Beaufort
Vladimir Cerny as Master Crewman
Samo Chrtan as Young Henry
Andrej Hryc as Magistrate
David Jensen as Fullbright
Ondrej Koval as Frederick
Roger La Page as Dr. Vandenberg
Daniel Williams as William Frankenstein

Reception
Reviews were generally positive with reviewers often singling out the film as a faithful adaptation of Mary Shelley's work. Variety said "Faithfully retelling a 19th century gothic novel means daring to be boring in places, but the peaks far outweigh those flat and arid stretches in this beautifully assembled Hallmark production." 

Kim Newman said "This finally fulfils the promise many - including Frankenstein: The True Story and Mary Shelley's Frankenstein - failed to keep and is a faithful, respectful, slightly stiff adaptation of the novel." DVD Talk gave the film three and a half stars saying "The story takes a while to get emotionally involved in, but if you give it a chance, your patience will be rewarded in the last half of the film. Because of its emphasis on tragedy over horror, and because of its loyalty to Shelley's original work, I'm going to go ahead and give this one a recommendation." 

Guy Adams writing for the British Fantasy Society reiterates that the "three hour mini-series sticks closely to the original novel" and said, "It's definitely a TV version (though thankfully light on the usual Hallmark Channel vaseline and whimsy), a little flat in places, but it is an honourable and enjoyable attempt at providing a definitive version of Shelley's book."

References

External links

Frankenstein films
Films shot in New Orleans
Films directed by Kevin Connor
Films set in Germany
Films set in Switzerland
Films set in the 1810s